The 1959 Jacksonville State Gamecocks football team represented Jacksonville State College (now known as Jacksonville State University) as a member of the Alabama Collegiate Conference (ACC) during the 1959 NAIA football season. Led by 13th-year head coach Don Salls, the Gamecocks compiled an overall record of 6–2–1 with a mark of 2–0 in conference play, and finished as ACC co-champion.

Schedule

References

Jacksonville State
Jacksonville State Gamecocks football seasons
Alabama Collegiate Conference football champion seasons
Jacksonville State Gamecocks football